Antonio Arregui Yarza (born June 3, 1939 in Oñate) is the Roman Catholic Archbishop Emeritus of Guayaquil Ecuador.

Yarza is an alumnus of the Pontifical University of St. Thomas Aquinas Angelicum in Rome, where he earned a doctorate in canon Law.

Archbishop Arregui Yarza was Auxiliary Bishop of Quito and Titular Bishop of Auzegera from January 4, 1990, to  July 25, 1995.

He served as the Bishop of Ibarra from July 25, 1995, to May 7, 2003.

He was appointed Archbishop of Guayaquil on May 7, 2003, replacing Archbishop Juan Ignacio Larrea Holguín. Yarza retired on September 24, 2015.

As of September 2012, he was the President of the Conferencia Episcopal Ecuatoriana (the Roman Catholic Conference of Bishops of Ecuador).

On September 18, 2012, he was named by Pope Benedict XVI as one of the papally-appointed Synod Fathers for the upcoming October 2012 Ordinary General Assembly of the Synod of Bishops on the New Evangelization.

See also
Timeline of Opus Dei

References

External links

Catholic Hierarchy: Archbishop Antonio Arregui Yarza

1939 births
Living people
21st-century Roman Catholic archbishops in Ecuador
Opus Dei members
20th-century Roman Catholic bishops in Ecuador
University of Navarra alumni
Pontifical University of Saint Thomas Aquinas alumni
People from Oñati
Roman Catholic archbishops of Guayaquil
Roman Catholic bishops of Quito